Billiri (or Biliri) is one of the 11 Local Government Area of Gombe State, Nigeria  bordered to the north by Akko LGA, south and east by Shongom as well as North-East by Kaltungo LGAs. It is a historical settlement of the Tangales which is located South of  Gombe It has an area of 737 km and a population of 202,144 at the 2006 census. Apart from  Tangale language, Fulfulde and Hausa  are commonly spoken The postal code of the area is 771.

Most of the inhabitants of Billiri are Christians while Muslims formed the largest minority. The dominant tribe is Tangale which means "Tangle".

The  traditional ruler of the LGA is called the "Mai Tangale". The death of the Mai Tangale in 2020 brought about communal unrest in the Biliri community due to the delay in reinstating a new Mai Tangale.

History 
The Tangale people claimed to have emerged as the settlers of Billiri from a migration journey through Borno State.They had to move from places such as Sanum kede and Kupto due to tribal wars. Tangaltong, one of the 7 clans in Tangale is where billiri as well as Bare and Kantali resided. The Tangale language is a west chadic language.

Mai Tangale 
The traditional ruler of the Tangale Tribe is addressed as Mai Tangale. Following the death of the former King, Mallam Danladi Maiyamba was elected as the new Mai Tangale in 2020.

The Billiri Crisis 
In March 2021, Danladi Sanusi-Maiyamba was announced by the Gombe State government as the new Mai Tangale in Billiri following the death of Abdu Baba Maisharu II, the immediate past Mai of Tangale Kingdom who died in January 2021.
The announcement erupted violence and protests in Billiri over the claim that Inuwa Yahaya, governor of the state, did not go with the candidate selected by the kingmakers.
The erupted concerns and protests led to violence that claimed lives and properties.

Towns & Villages 
The towns and villages in Billiri include:

 Billiri-tangale
 Ayabu
 Baganje
 Bare
 Billiri
 Kalmai
 Kulkul
 Labepit
 Lakalkal
 Lamugu
 Landongu
 Pokuli
 Lanshi daji
 Popandi
 Sabon layi
 Sansani
 Pandiukude
 Pandi kamio
 Pokwangli
 Shelu
 Sikirit
 Tal
 Tanglang
 Todi
 Tudu kwaya

Wards/Polling units 
There are 10 wards in Billiri local government and they are:

 Bangaje North

2. Bangaje South

3. Bare

4. Billiri North

5. Billiri South

6. Kalmai

7. Todi

8. Tudu Kwaya

9. Tal

10. Tanglang

Schools 
They include:

Central Primary School

Government Day Secondary School Amtawlam

Federal Government College Billiri (FGC) 

Government Sciences Secondary School Billiri

Food 
Soya beans is one of the common foods in Billiri with about six prominent markets according to a study

Festivals 
Bai "Dog meat" Eating festival

References 

Local Government Areas in Gombe State